Godfrey atte Curt (fl. 1298) was an English politician.

He was a Member (MP) of the Parliament of England for New Shoreham in 1298.

References 

13th-century births
Year of death missing
English MPs 1298